De Vos is a Dutch-language surname meaning "the fox". In 2007 in the Netherlands, nearly all ≈11,000 people with the name spelled it de Vos, while in 2008 in Belgium, primarily in East Flanders, nearly all ≈11,000 people with the name capitalized it De Vos. Another 9220 people in Belgium, mostly in West Flanders have the concatenated form Devos, while in the United States the form DeVos can be found.

Notable people with the name include:

de Vos 
Adam de Vos (born 1993), Canadian cyclist
Anna-Marie de Vos (born 1960), South African lawyer and judge
Asha de Vos, Sri Lankan marine biologist
Charlotte De Vos (born 1983), Belgian field hockey player
Cornelis de Vos (1584–1651), Flemish painter, draughtsman and art dealer, brother of Paul de Vos
Ernie de Vos (1941–2005), Dutch-born Canadian racing driver
Frank de Vos (born 1956), Dutch sports sailor
Geert De Vos (born 1981), Belgian dart player
Ingmar De Vos (born 1963), Belgian equestrian sports manager
Jan De Vos (politician) (1844–1922), Belgian mayor of Antwerp
Jan de Vos (historian) (1936–2011), Belgian historian who lived in Mexico
Jason de Vos (born 1974),  Canadian soccer player and commentator
Judocus de Vos (1661–1734), Flemish weaver
Justin de Vos (born 1998), Dutch footballer
Lambert de Vos (fl 1563–1574), Flemish painter and illustrator
 (c.1533–1580), Flemish composer
 (born 1946), Belgian military historian
Luc De Vos (1962–2014), Belgian rock musician and writer
Maerten de Vos (1532–1603), Flemish painter
 (1645–1717), Flemish sculptor
Marie-Louise De Vos (born 1941), Belgian film actress
Miriam Phoebe de Vos (1912–2005), South African botanist
Nathalie De Vos (born 1982), Belgian long-distance runner
Niels de Vos, British sports businessman and chief executive
Paul de Vos (c.1592–1678), Flemish animal and still life painter, brother of Cornelis de Vos
Paul De Vos (born 1950s), Belgian microbiologist
Peter Jon de Vos (1938–2008), American ambassador
 (born 1939), South African author
Pierre de Vos (born 1963), South African constitutional law scholar
Sander De Vos (born 1985), Flemish technology guru
Simon de Vos (1603–1676),  Flemish painter, draughtsman and art collector
Tjakko de Vos (born 1956), Dutch ice hockey player
Vincent De Vos (1829–1875), Belgian animal painter
Willem de Vos (c.1593 – c.1629), Flemish painter
Willem de Vos (born 1954), Dutch microbiologist
Willy de Vos (1880–1957), Dutch footballer
Wim de Vos (born 1968), Dutch cyclo-cross racer

De Vos van Steenwijk 
De Vos van Steenwijk, Dutch noble family
Carel de Vos van Steenwijk (1759–1830), Dutch politician
 (1746–1813), Dutch politician
Jan Arend Godert de Vos van Steenwijk (1818–1905), Dutch politician
Willem Lodewijk de Vos van Steenwijk (1859–1947), Dutch politician

See also
Reinaert de Vos, protagonist fox from the collection of fables known as Reynard
Vos (surname), Dutch surname

References

Surnames of Belgian origin
Dutch-language surnames
Surnames from nicknames